Bucureșci is a commune in Hunedoara County, Transylvania, Romania. It is composed of five villages: Bucureșci, Curechiu (Kurety), Merișor, Rovina, and Șesuri (Seszur).

The commune is located in the northern part of the county,  from Deva. It is traversed by the river Bucureșci, a left tributary of the Crișul Alb. 

Notable is the Saint Nicholas Church, located in Curechiu. This is a wooden church, built in 1785.

References

Communes in Hunedoara County
Localities in Transylvania